Jean Laurent (30 December 1906 in Maisons-Alfort – 14 May 1995) was a French international footballer. He played as a defender. He was the elder brother of Lucien Laurent, who was also an international footballer, and scored the first goal in the history of the Football World Cup.

Jean Laurent played for CA Paris, FC Sochaux, Club Français, Stade Rennais, and Toulouse FC (1937). He played for France between 1930 and 1932 and won a total of 9 caps. He took part in the 1930 World Cup.

He died at the age of 88 in 1995.

External links

1906 births
1995 deaths
People from Maisons-Alfort
French footballers
France international footballers
1930 FIFA World Cup players
Ligue 1 players
Stade Rennais F.C. players
FC Sochaux-Montbéliard players
Toulouse FC (1937) players
Association football defenders
Footballers from Val-de-Marne